Bernhard Kölver (1938 – 2001) was a German Indologist, specializing for most of his career in the study of Nepal.

Kölver was born in Cologne, Germany. He received his PhD with a dissertation on Tokharian nominal morphology from Cologne University in 1965. He was professor of Indology in Kiel, Germany (1974-1993) and Leipzig, Germany (1993-).

After a trip to Nepal Kölver specialized in the study of this country, especially the Newar language. In 1995 he was elected to the Saxon Academy of Sciences in Leipzi]. He was also awarded the Triśaktipaṭṭabhūṣaṇa by King Birendra of Nepal in honor of his service to scholarship.

Works
Kölver, Bernhard 1969. Tulu texts, with glossary. Dravidian tales from the south of India. Publisher: Wiesbaden, F. Steiner, 1969.
Kölver, Bernhard (1971). Textkritische und philologische Untersuchungen zur Rājataraṅgiṇī des Kalhana. Wiesbaden : F. Steiner, 1971.
Kölver, Ulrike and Bernhard Kölver 1975. 'On Newari noun inflection.' Zentralasiaticshe Studien, 9:87-117. Wiesbaden: Otto Harrassowitz. 
Kölver, Ulrike and Bernhard Kölver 1978. 'Classical Newari verbal morphology." Zentralasiaticshe Studien 12: 273-316. Wiesbaden: Otto Harrassowitz.
Kölver, Bernhard, and Hem Raj Shakya 1985. Documents from the Rudravarṇa-Mahāvihāra, Pāṭan. Sankt Augustin, VGH Wissenshaftsverlag.
Gutschow, Niels, Bernhard Kölver, and Ishwaranand Shresthacarya 1987. Newar towns and buildings: an illustrated dictionary Newārī-English. Sankt Augustin: VGH Wissenschaftsverlag, 1987.
Kölver, Bernhard 1992. Re-building a stūpa: architectural drawings of the Svayaṃbhūnāth. Bonn: VGH Wissenschaftsverlag.
Kölver, Bernhard 1996. Constructing pagodas according to traditional Nepalese drawings. Berlin: Akademie Verlag.

References

Newar studies scholars
German Indologists
Writers from Cologne
Academic staff of the University of Kiel
Academic staff of Leipzig University
1938 births
2001 deaths